Venustatrochus georgianus is a species of sea snail, a marine gastropod mollusk in the family Calliostomatidae.

Description
The height of the shell attains 40 mm.

Distribution
This marine species occurs off the South Georgia Islands at depths between 108 m and 144 m.

References

 Powell, A. W. B. 1951. Antarctic and Subantarctic Mollusca: Pelecypoda and Gastropoda. Discovery Reports 26: 47–196, pls. 5–10.
 Engl W. (2012) Shells of Antarctica. Hackenheim: Conchbooks. 402 pp.

External links
 To Antarctic Invertebrates
 To Biodiversity Heritage Library (3 publications)
 To Encyclopedia of Life
 To USNM Invertebrate Zoology Mollusca Collection
 To World Register of Marine Species
 

georgianus
Gastropods described in 1951